Augustus Marie Martin (February 1, 1803 – September 29, 1875) was a French-born prelate of the Roman Catholic Church. He served as the first bishop of the Diocese of Natchitoches in Louisiana from 1853 until 1875.

Biography

Early life 
Augustus Martin was born in September 1825 in Saint-Malo, Brittany, in Franceand studied under Jean-Marie de Lamennais. As a seminarian, he was attending the Grand Almonry of France in Paris under Cardinal Gustave Maximilien Juste de Croÿ-Solre.

Priesthood 
Martin was ordained to the priesthood in September, 1825. He served as pastor in Bleurais and Vern before being assigned as chaplain of the Royal College of Rennes in Rennes, France.  In 1839, Martin accepted an invitation from Bishop Célestine Guynemer de la Hailandière to immigrate to the United States and join the Diocese of Vincennes in Indiana.

After arriving in Indiana in 1839, Martin was appointed pastor of St. Vincent's Parish in Logansport, Indiana and the Cathedral in Vincennes, Indiana.  In 1843, he was named vicar general of the diocese (1843–1846), in addition to engaging in the missions of Indiana. During this time, Martin became a confidant of Theodore Guerin, the founder of the Sisters of Providence of Saint Mary-of-the-Woods in the diocese in 1840. The two corresponded often, exchanging letters back and forth.

Although it was reported that Martin left the Diocese of Vincennes due to failing health, it was in fact due to the problems created by Hailandiere.  Martin had been recruited by Hailandiere, but because of Hailandiere's insistence on total control, many priests left the diocese.  In 1846, Martin went to Louisiana, where he was appointed to St. Martin's Parish at Attakapas. In 1847 he became pastor of St. Joseph's Parish in Baton Rouge, St. John's Parish at the Plains, and St. Magdalen's Parish in Manchac, Louisiana., Martin was transferred to St. Francis of Assisi Parish in Natchitoches, Louisiana, in 1849. He was made vicar forane of north Louisiana under Archbishop Antoine Blanc,in 1850.

Bishop of Natchitoches 
On July 29, 1853, Martin was appointed the first bishop of the newly erected Diocese of Natchitoches by Pope Pius IX. He received his episcopal consecration on November 30, 1853, from Archbishop Blanc, with Bishops Michael Portier and James Oliver Van de Velde serving as co-consecrators, at the St. Louis Cathedral in New Orleans. During his 22-year-long tenure, Martin recruited priests and religious from Europe for the diocese, established a seminary to train native clergy, founded numerous missions, and erected a cathedral. He guided the diocese during the American Civil War (1861–1865), and attended the Second Plenary Council of Baltimore (1866) and First Vatican Council in Rome (1869–1870).

Augustus Martin died in Natchitoches on September 29, 1875 at age 72.

References

1803 births
1875 deaths
French emigrants to the United States
Clergy from Saint-Malo
Catholic Church in Indiana
Roman Catholic bishops of Alexandria
19th-century Roman Catholic bishops in the United States